Caesium cyanide (chemical formula: CsCN) is the caesium salt of hydrogen cyanide. It is a white solid, easily soluble in water, with a smell reminiscent of bitter almonds, and with crystals similar in appearance to sugar. Caesium cyanide has chemical properties similar to potassium cyanide and is very toxic.

Production 
Hydrogen cyanide reacts with caesium hydroxide giving caesium cyanide and water:
HCN + CsOH → CsCN + H2O.

References 

Cyanides
Caesium compounds